Diken is a city in India.

Diken may also refer to:
 Diken (newspaper), a newspaper in Turkey
 Diken (magazine), an Ottoman satirical magazine